Lucas Rougeaux (born 10 March 1994) is a French footballer who plays as a centre back.

Rougeaux joined the OGC Nice academy in 2008 and made his Ligue 1 debut for the club as a late substitute in a 4-0 loss to Evian on 12 May 2013. He has represented France at under-18, under-19 and under-20 levels. He was a member of the under-19 squad that reached the final of the 2013 UEFA European Under-19 Championship.

Rougeaux joined third-level club Fréjus Saint-Raphaël on loan for the 2014–15 season.

Career statistics

References

External links

 
 

1994 births
People from Grasse
Sportspeople from Alpes-Maritimes
Footballers from Provence-Alpes-Côte d'Azur
Living people
French footballers
France youth international footballers
Association football central defenders
OGC Nice players
ÉFC Fréjus Saint-Raphaël players
US Boulogne players
K.V. Kortrijk players
Ligue 1 players
Championnat National players
Belgian Pro League players
French expatriate footballers
Expatriate footballers in Belgium
French expatriate sportspeople in Belgium